Sledge-Hayley House is a historic home located at Warrenton, Warren County, North Carolina.  It was built between 1852 and 1855, and is a two-story, three bay, Greek Revival style rectangular frame dwelling.  It has a hipped roof with deep overhang and sits on a brick basement. The front facade has a one-bay entrance porch supported by two unfluted Doric order columns.

It was listed on the National Register of Historic Places in 1980.

References

Houses on the National Register of Historic Places in North Carolina
Greek Revival houses in North Carolina
Houses completed in 1855
Houses in Warren County, North Carolina
National Register of Historic Places in Warren County, North Carolina